Frank Dominik (born 7 January 1931) is an Austrian bobsledder. He competed in the four-man event at the 1956 Winter Olympics.

References

External links

1931 births
Possibly living people
Austrian male bobsledders
Olympic bobsledders of Austria
Bobsledders at the 1956 Winter Olympics
Place of birth missing (living people)